Isac Alexi Sivert Lidberg (born 8 September 1998) is a Swedish professional footballer who plays for Eredivisie club Go Ahead Eagles as a forward.

He is son to wrestler Martin Lidberg.

Personal life
Isac grew up mainly in Stockholm and is the second born child to Swedish reality television star and wrestling world champion Martin Lidberg. His uncle is Jimmy Lidberg, a fellow Olympic medalist wrestler. He practiced wrestling as well for several years and was a big talent, but quit to focus on his football instead. Lidberg dreams of playing for Bayern Munich one day and his idol footballer is the German striker Mario Gomez.

Club career

Hammarby IF
Lidberg started out his football career with local side Hägerstens SK, but moved to Hammarby Sjöstad and began to play for Hammarby IF as an eleven-year-old. Advancing through the youth teams, Lidberg played his first game for Hammarby's under 21-team against GIF Sundsvall 2014 as a substitute, and scored a 2–1 goal within a minute. In March 2015, Hammarby offered him a 3-year-long senior contract, which he signed.

The senior debut came already the same year in Allsvenskan, when Isac Lidberg got substituted with Linus Hallenius in a game against Falkenbergs FF on 13 July. The 16-year-old Lidberg became the youngest player ever representing Hammarby in Allsvenskan. He played his second game in Allsvenskan on the last game day of the  2015 season in Hammarby's 2–1 loss away against Halmstads BK.

Lidberg made another five appearances in Allsvenskan for the club during the 2016 season.

Loan to Enskede IK

On 8 April 2016 it was announced that Lidberg was going to be on loan to newly promoted Division 1 club Enskede IK for the whole season. With Enskede being Hammarby's partner club, an agreement was made that the player was allowed to represent both clubs during the loan period.

In his first start for the club, he scored two goals in Enskede's 3–1 win against Piteå IF on 1 May. Lidberg would later move on to make another 14 appearances for the side during the season, scoring 6 goals in the league play.

Åtvidabergs FF
On 30 March 2017, he signed a permanent deal with Åtvidabergs FF in Superettan, the Swedish second tier. He signed a three-year contract with his new club. Hammarby reportedly sold Lidberg after the two parts could not agree on a new contract.

Isac Lidberg made his debut for Åtvidaberg on match day one of the 2017 Superettan against IFK Värnamo on away turf. His new team lost 4–0 with Lidberg getting sent off in the last few minutes of the game, after coming on as a substitute.

Start
On 11 January 2018, Lidberg signed a three-year contract with Norwegian Eliteserien club Start. On 4 March, he moved to Jerv on loan, on a deal until 1 August. On 8 April, he made his debut for Jerv, coming on as a substitute for Aram Khalili in the 1–1 home draw against Ull/Kisa. On 17 June, he scored his first goal, in a 3–2 defeat to Florø.

Initially returning to Start, on 15 August 2018 he moved – again on loan – to HamKam. On 19 August, he made his debut for the club in a 1–0 defeat to Nest-Sotra.

In February 2019, Lidberg was loaned out to IF Brommapojkarna on a loan agreement for the 2019 season.

Gefle IF
In February 2020, Lidberg signed a two-year contract with Gefle IF competing in the Swedish third tier, Ettan. In the third division, he had a successful spell, making 25 appearances in which he scored 19 goals in his first season at the club.

Go Ahead Eagles
On 1 May 2021, Lidberg signed a two-year contract with an option of an additional year with newly promoted Dutch Eredivisie club Go Ahead Eagles. He made his debut in the Eredivisie on 13 August 2021 in a 1–0 loss to SC Heerenveen.

International career
Isac Lidberg played 14 games for Sweden U17, in which he scored nine goals, between 2014 and 2015.

As of the end of 2016, he has won 11 caps for Sweden U19 and scored 10 goals in total.

Style of play
He describe himself as a "powerful forward that can score on anything", which is something then manager Nanne Bergstrand agreed upon, stating that he's strong for his age due to training from an early age. Hammarby's former sporting director Mats Jingblad added that Lidberg is a modern forward that often make runs behind the defenders.

Career statistics

Club

References

External links
 
 

1998 births
Living people
Association football midfielders
Swedish footballers
Sweden youth international footballers
Swedish expatriate footballers
Allsvenskan players
Superettan players
Ettan Fotboll players
Norwegian First Division players
Hammarby Fotboll players
Enskede IK players
Åtvidabergs FF players
IK Start players
FK Jerv players
Gefle IF players
IF Brommapojkarna players
Go Ahead Eagles players
Hamarkameratene players
Swedish expatriate sportspeople in Norway
Swedish expatriate sportspeople in the Netherlands
Expatriate footballers in Norway
Expatriate footballers in the Netherlands